Rhinomalus is a genus of beetles in the family Laemophloeidae, containing the following species:

 Rhinomalus anthracinus Sharp
 Rhinomalus chriquensis Sharp
 Rhinomalus ruficollis Grouvelle
 Rhinomalus rufirostris Chevrolat

References

Laemophloeidae
Cucujoidea genera